Warashi Inc. (株式会社 童) was a small Japanese company who develops video games for arcade, home console, and mobile platforms, specializes in Mahjong and shoot 'em up titles. It is known for the Shienryu series of games and for releasing one of the final Dreamcast games in early 2007.

Developed titles

Shooters
 Shienryu—(1997), (ST-V/Saturn/PlayStation 2)
 Simple Character 2000 Series Vol. 8, Kagaru Ninja Tai Gatchaman: The Shooting—(2002), (PlayStation)
 Sengeki Striker—(1997), (Kaneko Super Nova System)
 Shienryu Explosion—(2003), (PlayStation 2)
 Triggerheart Exelica—(2006), (NAOMI/Dreamcast/Xbox 360)
 Triggerheart Exelica Enhanced—(2009), (PlayStation 2)

Mahjong
 Akagi ~Yami ni Oritatta Tensai~—(2002), (PlayStation 2)
 Gal Jan—(1996), (Saturn)
 Simple 1500 Series, The Mahjong 2—(), (PlayStation)
 Simple 1500 Series, The Shisenshou 2—(), (PlayStation)
 Simple 2000 Honkaku Shikou Series Vol. 4, The Mahjong—(), (PlayStation 2)
 Simple DS Series, The Mahjong—(2005), (Nintendo DS)
 Stylish Mahjong: Usagi ~Yasei no Toupai~ & Usagi ~Yasei no Toupai the Arcade~ Double Pack—(), (PlayStation 2)

Other
 Break 'Em All—(2005), (Nintendo DS)
 Simple 1500 Series The Shougi 2—(), (PlayStation)
 Simple 2000 Series Vol. 12, The Quiz 20,000 Questions—(2002), (PlayStation 2)
 Simple 2000 Series Vol. 85, The Sekai Meisaku Gekijou Quiz—(), (PlayStation 2)
 Simple DS Series Vol. 3, Beetle King—(2005), (Nintendo DS)

External links
 (archived from the original) 

Video game development companies
Amusement companies of Japan
Companies established in 1995
Video game companies of Japan